The pressure flow hypothesis, also known as the mass flow hypothesis, is the best-supported theory to explain the movement of sap through the phloem. It was proposed by Ernst Münch, a German plant physiologist in 1930.
A high concentration of organic substances, particularly sugar, inside cells of the phloem at a source, such as a leaf, creates a diffusion gradient (osmotic gradient) that draws water into the cells from the adjacent xylem. This creates turgor pressure, also known as hydrostatic pressure, in the phloem. Movement of phloem sap occurs by bulk flow (mass flow) from sugar sources to sugar sinks. The movement in phloem is bidirectional, whereas, in xylem cells, it is unidirectional (upward). Because of this multi-directional flow, coupled with the fact that sap cannot move with ease between adjacent sieve-tubes, it is not unusual for sap in adjacent sieve-tubes to be flowing in opposite directions.

Sources and sinks
A sugar source is any part of the plant that is producing or releasing sugar.

During the plant's growth period, usually during the spring, storage organs such as the roots are sugar sources, and the plant's many growing areas are sugar sinks.

After the growth period, when the meristems are dormant, the leaves are sources, and storage organs are sinks. Developing seed-bearing organs (such as fruit) are always sinks.

Mechanisms
While movement of water and minerals through the xylem is driven by negative pressures (tension) most of the time, movement through the phloem is driven by positive hydrostatic pressure. This process is termed translocation, and is accomplished by a process called phloem loading and unloading. Cells in a sugar source "load" a sieve-tube element by actively transporting solute molecules into it. This causes water to move into the sieve-tube element by osmosis, creating pressure that pushes the sap down the tube. In sugar sinks, cells actively transport solutes out of the sieve-tube elements, producing the exactly opposite effect. The gradient of sugar from source to sink causes pressure flow through the sieve tube toward the sink.

The mechanisms are as follows:

Glucose is produced by photosynthesis in the mesophyll cells of green leaves. Some glucose is used within the cells during respiration. The rest of the glucose is converted into non-reducing sugar i.e. sucrose. It has been shown that the sucrose concentration in sieve tubes in leaves is commonly between 10 and 30 percent whereas it forms only 0.5% solution in the photosynthesis cells.
The sucrose is actively transported to the companion cells of the smallest veins in the leaves.
The sucrose diffuses through the plasmodesmata from the companion cells to the sieve tube elements. As a result, concentration of sucrose increases in the sieve tube elements.
Water moves by osmosis from the nearby xylem in the same leaf vein. This increases the hydrostatic pressure of the sieve tube elements.
Hydrostatic pressure moves the sucrose and other substances through the sieve tube cells, towards a sink.
In the storage sinks, such as sugar beet root and sugar cane stem, sucrose is removed into apoplast prior to entering the symplast of the sink.
Water moves out of the sieve tube cells by osmosis, lowering the hydrostatic pressure within them. Thus the pressure gradient is established as a consequence of entry of sugars in sieve elements at the source and removal of sucrose at the sink. The presence of sieve plates greatly increases the resistance along the pathway and results in the generation and maintenance of substantial pressure gradients in the sieve elements between source and sink.
 The phloem sugar is removed by the cortex of both stem and root, and is consumed by cellular respiration or else converted into starch. Starch is insoluble and exerts no osmotic effect. Consequently, the osmotic pressure of the contents of phloem decreases. Finally relatively pure water is left in the phloem and this is thought to leave by osmosis or be drawn back into nearby xylem vessels by suction of the transpiration pull.

The pressure flow mechanism depends upon:
 Turgor pressure
 Difference of osmotic pressure gradient along the direction of flow between the source and the sink.

Evidence
There are different pieces of evidences that support the hypothesis. Firstly, there is an exudation of solution from the phloem when the stem is cut or punctured by the Stylet of an aphid, a classical experiment demonstrating the translocation function of phloem, indicating that the phloem sap is under pressure. Secondly, concentration gradients of organic solutes are proved to be present between the sink and the source. Thirdly, when viruses or growth chemicals are applied to a well-illuminated (actively photosynthesising) leaf, they are translocated downwards to the roots. Yet, when applied to shaded leaves, such downward translocation of chemicals does not occur, hence showing that diffusion is not a possible process involved in translocation.

Criticisms
Opposition or criticisms against the hypothesis are often voiced. Some argue that mass flow is a passive process while sieve tube vessels are supported by companion cells. Hence, the hypothesis neglects the living nature of phloem. Moreover, it is found that amino acids and sugars (examples of organic solutes) are translocated at different rates, which is contrary to the assumption in the hypothesis that all materials being transported would travel at uniform speed. Bi-directional movements of solutes in translocation process as well as the fact that translocation is heavily affected by changes in environmental conditions like temperature and metabolic inhibitors are two defects of the hypothesis.

An objection leveled against the pressure flow mechanism is that it does not explain the phenomenon of bidirectional movement i.e. movement of different substances in opponent directions at the same time. The phenomenon of bidirectional movement can be demonstrated by applying two different substances at the same time to the phloem of a stem at two different points, and following their longitudinal movement along the stem. If the mechanism of translocation operates according to pressure flow hypothesis, bidirectional movement in a single sieve tube is not possible. Experiments to demonstrate bidirectional movement in a single sieve tube are technically very difficult to perform. Some experiments indicate that bidirectional movement may occur in a single sieve tube, whereas others do not.

Other theories
Some plants appear not to load phloem by active transport. In these cases a mechanism known as the polymer trap mechanism was proposed by Robert Turgeon. In this case small sugars such as sucrose move into intermediary cells through narrow plasmodesmata, where they are polymerised to raffinose and other larger oligosaccharides. Now they are unable to move back, but can proceed through wider plasmodesmata into the sieve tube element.

The symplastic phloem loading is confined mostly to plants in tropical rain forests and is seen as more primitive. The actively transported apoplastic phloem loading is viewed as more advanced, as it is found in the later-evolved plants, and particularly in those in temperate and arid conditions.  This mechanism may therefore have allowed plants to colonise the cooler locations.

Organic molecules such as sugars, amino acids, certain hormones, and even messenger RNAs are transported in the phloem through sieve tube elements.

References

Ho, Y.K. (Manhattan, 2004.)Advanced Level Biology for Hong Kong 3,Page, 203.
4.http://bcs.whfreeman.com/webpub/Ektron/Hillis%20Principles%20of%20Life2e/Animated%20Tutorials/pol2e_at_2504_The_Pressure_Flow_Model/pol2e_at_2504_The_Pressure_Flow_Model.html
Plant physiology